Balehonnur is a town in Narasimharajapura taluk, a township of the Chikkamagaluru district in the Indian state of Karnataka. It is located 286 kilometres west of Bengaluru, 226 kilometres north-west of Mysuru and 142 kilometres north-east of Mangaluru. It is famous for being the oldest Dharma Peetha among the five Panchapeethas—Rambhapuri Peetha of Veerashaiva sect of the Hindu religion. Balehonnur is located around 50 km northwest of Chikmagalur.

History 
According to Hindu mythology, it is said that Shiva himself came out of the linga in human form as Paramacharya Renukacharya.

Baba Bandesha dargah is located in main road of the city and yearly traditional "Urs" is celebrated every year.

Geography 
Its geographical map coordinates are 13° 21' 0" North, 75° 28' 0" east. It is located 286 kilometers west of Bengaluru, 226 kilometers north-west of Mysuru and 142 kilometers north-east of Mangaluru. It is located on the bank of Bhadra River.

Balehonnur Bridge
Balehonnur Bridge (a masonry bridge), constructed across the river Bhadra by the Madras Government, was the first project undertaken by MCC in 1946.

Transport

Road
Balehonnur is well-connected by road. There are daily buses to Bangalore.  The state highway SH-27 cuts across Balehonnur which connects to the National highway 13 at Sringeri.

Rail
The closest railway stations are in Chikmagalur (50 km), Shivamogga (87 km), Bhadravati (83 km), and Kadur (90 km).

Climate

References

Villages in Chikkamagaluru district
Hill stations in Karnataka